This is a list of players, past and present, who have been capped by their country in international football whilst playing for Al Sadd Sports Club from twelve countries. The first tournament in which Al Sadd SC players participated was the Summer Olympics in 1984 with four players, including Khalid Salman who scored a brace against France which account for the only two goals Qatar scored during the tournament. At the end of the year Qatar participated for the second time in a row in the AFC Asian Cup and for the first time there were players from the club and Salman led Qatar to the only victory against South Korea. The first non-Qatari player to participate in the AFC Asian Cup was the Iranian Ali Daei in 1996 where he ranked third,

Players

Qatari players

Foreign players

Players in international competitions

Asian Cup Players
  
 

1984 Asian Cup
  Mubarak Anber
  Mohammed Al Ammari
  Khalid Salman
  Sami Mohamed Wafa

1988 Asian Cup
  Yousef Al-Adsani
  Mohammed Al Ammari
  Khalid Salman

1992 Asian Cup
  Zamel Al Kuwari
  Yousef Al-Adsani
  Fahad Al Kuwari
  Abdulnasser Al-Obaidly
  Jaffal Rashid
  Khalid Khamis Al-Sulaiti

1996 Asian Cup
  Ali Daei

2000 Asian Cup
  Abdulnasser Al Obaidly
  Dahi Saad Al Naemi
  Fahad Al Kuwari
  Jassim Al-Tamimi
  Adel Jadou

2004 Asian Cup
  Wesam Rizik
  Ezzat Jadoua
  Mohammed Gholam

2007 Asian Cup
  Mohamed Saqr
  Mesaad Al-Hamad
  Ali Nasser
  Ali Afif
  Magid Mohamed
  Talal Al-Bloushi
  Mohammed Gholam
  Wesam Rizik
  Ibrahim Majid
  Abdulla Koni
  Mohammed Rabia Al-Noobi

2011 Asian Cup
  Mohammed Kasola
  Hassan Al Haydos
  Wesam Rizik
  Mesaad Al-Hamad
  Yusef Ahmed
  Ibrahim Majid
  Khalfan Ibrahim
  Talal Al-Bloushi
  Ali Afif
  Saad Al Sheeb
  Lee Jung-soo

2015 Asian Cup
  Abdelkarim Hassan
  Almahdi Ali Mukhtar
  Ali Assadalla
  Khalfan Ibrahim
  Hassan Al-Haydos
  Ibrahim Majid
  Saad Al Sheeb

2019 Asian Cup
  Saad Al Sheeb
  Ró-Ró
  Abdelkarim Hassan
  Tarek Salman
  Hamid Ismail
  Hassan Al-Haydos
  Akram Afif
  Salem Al-Hajri
  Boualem Khoukhi
  Jung Woo-young

African Cup, Copa América, Gold Cup, Olympic, Players
  
 

1984 Summer Olympics
  Yousef Al-Adsani
  Mubarak Anber
  Mohamed Al-Ammari
  Khalid Salman

2006 Africa Cup of Nations
  José Clayton

2010 Africa Cup of Nations
  Opoku Agyemang

2012 Africa Cup of Nations
  Abdul Kader Keïta
  Mamadou Niang

2016 Summer Olympics
  Baghdad Bounedjah

2017 Africa Cup of Nations
  Baghdad Bounedjah

2019 Africa Cup of Nations
  Baghdad Bounedjah

2019 Copa América
  Saad Al Sheeb
  Ró-Ró
  Abdelkarim Hassan
  Tarek Salman
  Hamid Ismail
  Hassan Al-Haydos
  Akram Afif
  Salem Al-Hajri
  Boualem Khoukhi

2021 CONCACAF Gold Cup
  Saad Al Sheeb
  Ró-Ró
  Abdelkarim Hassan
  Mohammed Waad
  Tarek Salman
  Ahmed Suhail
  Hassan Al-Haydos
  Akram Afif
  Musab Kheder
  Boualem Khoukhi
  Yusuf Abdurisag
  Meshaal Barsham

2021 Africa Cup of Nations
  Baghdad Bounedjah
  André Ayew

World Cup Players

 
World Cup 2002
  John Utaka

2022 FIFA World Cup
  Saad Al-Sheeb
  Ró-Ró
  Abdelkarim Hassan
  Mohammed Waad
  Tarek Salman
  Ali Assadalla
  Hassan Al-Haydos
  Akram Afif
  Musab Kheder
  Boualem Khoukhi
  Salem Al-Hajri
  Meshaal Barsham
  Mostafa Meshaal
  André Ayew
  Jung Woo-young

Honours
Qatar
AFC Asian Cup: 2019

Algeria
 Africa Cup of Nations: 2019
FIFA Arab Cup: 2021

References

External links
National Football Teams

Al Sadd SC
 
Al Sadd SC international
Association football player non-biographical articles
Lists of international association football players by club